Regunathapuram is a village in the Pattukkottai taluk of Thanjavur district, Tamil Nadu, India.

Demographics 
The population in 2011 was 287.

References 

Villages in Thanjavur district